The St. Stephen Cathedral is a Byzantine Catholic (Ruthenian) cathedral located in Phoenix, Arizona, United States.  It is the cathedral for the Holy Protection of Mary Byzantine Catholic Eparchy of Phoenix.

History
Byzantine Catholics moved to the western United States from the east and in Phoenix they began to plan for a church of their own as early as 1956.  Ten years later they formally requested a parish from Bishop Nicholas Elko of Pittsburgh.  Permission was granted to acquire the property of the former St. Thomas the Apostle Antiochene Orthodox Church in 1968.  The first Divine Liturgy was celebrated on Easter Sunday.  The church was dedicated by Bishop Stephen Kocisko under the patronage of St. Stephen, the Proto-Martyr, on June 28, 1968. The Rev. Paul Bovankovich was appointed the parish's first pastor.  A rectory and parish hall were built in 1974, and a columbarium was added in 1991.

The Northridge earthquake in 1994 damaged the chancery offices of the Eparchy of Van Nuys and the Cathedral of St. Mary.  Bishop George Kuzma and his staff relocated to Phoenix and as a result St. Stephen's was named the pro-cathedral.  In 2010 the Eparchy of Van Nuys was officially renamed the Holy Protection of Mary Byzantine Catholic Eparchy of Phoenix and St. Stephen's was elevated to a cathedral from its pro-cathedral status.

In 2016, Father Diodoro Mendoza was appointed rector and pastor of St. Stephen Cathedral. In 2016, Bishop John Stephen Pazak succeeded Bishop Gerald Nicholas Dino as the bishop. Bishop Dino died on November 14, 2020. Bishop Pazak retired in August of 2021 and is a Bishop Emeritus.

Gallery

See also
List of Catholic cathedrals in the United States
List of cathedrals in the United States

References

External links
 Official Cathedral Site

Christian organizations established in 1968
Eastern Catholic churches in Arizona
Rusyn-American culture in Arizona
Rusyn-American history
Ukrainian-American culture in Arizona
Stephen, Phoenix
Churches in Phoenix, Arizona
Catholic cathedrals in Arizona